UNAVCO is a non-profit university-governed consortium that facilitates geology research and education using Geodesy. UNAVCO is funded by the National Science Foundation (NSF) and the National Aeronautics and Space Administration (NASA) to support geology research worldwide. UNAVCO operates the GAGE Facility (Geodetic Facility for the Advancement of geology) on behalf of the NSF and NASA. As a university-governed consortium, UNAVCO supports the goals of the academic scientific community. UNAVCO has 120 US academic members and supports over 110 organizations globally as associate members.

On January 1st, 2023, UNAVCO merged with the Incorporated Research Institutions for Seismology (IRIS) into the Earth Scope Consortium.

Tools and Services

Data
The UNAVCO GAGE Facility, as a World Data Center, provides access to scientific data for quantifying the motions of rock, ice, and water at or near the Earth's surface. Geodetic Imaging Data is collected by various sensors deployed on satellites, aircraft, and ground to provide high-resolution terrain models and deformation measurements over dozens of meters to hundreds of square kilometers. Data collected from strain and seismic borehole instruments measure the deformation at or near the surface of the Earth and measure rock physical properties in the vicinity of the installations. At many of the sites where geodetic measurements are made, meteorological data are also collected to aid in the processing of the geodetic data. Under the large EarthScope Plate Boundary Observatory, now known as the Network of the Americas (NOTA), UNAVCO acquires, archives, and distributes several community datasets, including GNSS/GPS, strainmeter, borehole seismometer, tilt meter, and geodetic imaging with radar and lidar.

Data are available online via http file servers and search interfaces.

GPS/GNSS Systems
The GAGE Facility manages a community pool of high accuracy portable GPS/GNSS receiver systems used for a range of applications. These complete systems – receivers, antennas, mounts, power and optional communications – can be deployed for days in episodic campaigns or for many months long-term investigations. Systems are also available for precision mapping applications.

Terrestrial Laser Scanning
The GAGE Facility at UNAVCO maintains a pool of Terrestrial Laser Scanning (TLS) instruments and associated peripherals, digital photography equipment, software and ancillary equipment optimized to support Earth science investigators. TLS technology is based on lidar ("Light Detection And Ranging", akin to the acronym "RADAR" based on radio wavelengths) and is also referred to as ground-based lidar or tripod lidar. It is an active imaging system whereby laser pulses are emitted by the scanner and observables include the time and intensity of pulse returns reflected by the surface or object being scanned.  The round-trip time for returned pulses enables very accurate determination of range (distance) to millions/billions of points, from which a 3D "point cloud" is generated.

The primary capability of TLS is the generation of high resolution 3D maps and images of surfaces and objects over scales of meters to kilometers with centimeter to sub-centimeter precision. Repeat TLS measurements allow the imaging and measurement of changes through time and in unprecedented detail, making TLS even more valuable for transformative science investigations.

TLS is a powerful geodetic imaging tool ideal for supporting a wide spectrum of user applications in many different environments. Geology applications to date include detailed mapping of fault scarps, geologic outcrops, fault-surface roughness, frost polygons, lava lakes, dikes, fissures, glaciers, columnar joints and hillside drainages. Repeat TLS surveys allow the imaging and measurement of surface changes through time due, for example, to surface processes, volcanic deformation, ice flow, beach morphology transitions, and post-seismic slip. The incorporation of GNSS/GPS measurements provides accurate georeferencing of TLS data in an absolute reference frame. The addition of digital photography yields photorealistic 3D images. It has been demonstrated that TLS derived 3D imagery is a unique and powerful tool for educational and outreach applications as well.

Engineering Expertise
The GAGE Facility provides engineering expertise and equipment resources to investigators in support of their geophysical research projects. This may include proposal planning, project logistics and support letters, field engineering support, modern GNSS equipment for loan to projects, permanent GNSS/GPS station installations, operation, and maintenance, and/or data acquisition, quality control, transfer, management, and archiving.

GAGE Facility engineers provide classroom and in-the-field training, project design and implementation, field engineering, TLS or GNSS/GPS network operations, and technology development for GNSS/GPS, TLS and other applications.

Polar services
The GAGE Facility provides geodetic support to NSF-OPP (National Science Foundation Office of Polar Programs) funded researchers working in the Arctic and Antarctic. Survey-grade GPS receivers, Terrestrial Laser Scanners, and supporting power and communications systems for continuous data collection and campaign surveying are available. Operation and maintenance services are also provided for long term data collection, with on-line data distribution from the UNAVCO community archive.

GGN, GNSS, IGS Support
The GAGE Facility provides global infrastructure support to NASA/JPL in operating a collection of high capability, globally distributed, permanent GNSS/GPS stations called the NASA Global GNSS Network (GGN). Data from these stations are used to produce highly accurate products for GNSS/GPS Earth science research, multidisciplinary applications, and education. UNAVCO also provides support for the International GNSS Service (IGS).

Short Courses, Workshops, Internships
The GAGE Facility's Education and Community Engagement (ECE) program offers short courses and workshops. They focus on professional development, research, and education, strategic support for scientific investigators in developing broader impacts, in-residence programs for geodesy science community members and educators, professional development in geosciences for K-12 faculty, and for undergraduate students through RESESS (Research Experiences in Solid Earth Science for Students), student internships to encourage broader participation in geosciences.

Plate Boundary Observatory (PBO)
UNAVCO operated the Plate Boundary Observatory (PBO), the geodetic component of the EarthScope program, funded by the National Science Foundation. The PBO consisted of several major observatory components: a network of 1100+ permanent, continuously operating Global Positioning System (GPS) stations many of which provided data at high-rate and in real-time, 78 borehole seismometers, 74 borehole strainmeters, 28 shallow borehole tiltmeters, and six long baseline laser strainmeters. These instruments are complemented by INSAR (interferometric synthetic aperture radar) and lidar imagery and geochronology.

Continuously Operating Caribbean GPS Observational Network (COCONet)
UNAVCO operated the Continuously Operating Caribbean GNSS/GPS Observational Network (COCONet), which consisted of 50 planned continuously operating GPS/weather stations integrated with 65 existing GPS stations operated by partner organizations, 15 of which will be upgraded with new equipment. COCONet provides free, high-quality, open-format GPS and meteorological data for these stations via the internet for use by scientists, government agencies, educators, students, and the private sector. These data are used by local and foreign researchers to study solid earth processes such as tectonic plate motions, tectonic plate boundary interaction and deformation, including earthquake cycle processes and risks. They also serve atmospheric scientists and weather forecasting groups by providing more precise estimates of tropospheric water vapor and enabling better forecasting of the dynamics of airborne moisture associated with the yearly Caribbean hurricane cycle.

Organization
As of 2012, UNAVCO is organized into three programs. The three programs focus on: (1) data collection, including installation and maintenance of large-scale geodetic instrument networks (Geodetic Infrastructure); (2) network data operations, community data products, and cyber infrastructure (Geodetic Data Services); and (3) education and outreach strategies (Education and Community Engagement).

Geodetic Infrastructure
The Geodetic Infrastructure (GI) program integrates all geodetic infrastructure and data acquisition capabilities for continuously operating observational networks and shorter-term deployments. Supported activities include development and testing, advanced systems engineering, the construction, operation, and maintenance of permanent geodetic instrument networks around the globe, and engineering services tailored to PI project requirements. Major projects currently supported by the GI program include the 1,112 station Plate Boundary Observatory (PBO), Polar networks in Greenland and Antarctica (GNET and ANET, together known as POLENET), COCONet spanning the Caribbean plate boundary, the multi-disciplinary AfricaArray, and several other smaller continuously observing geodetic networks.

Geodetic Data Services
Geodetic Data Services (GDS) program provides services for the long-term stewardship of unique data sets. These services organize, manage, and archive data, and develop tools for data access and interpretation. GDS provides a comprehensive suite of services including sensor network data operations, data products and services, data management and archiving, and advanced cyberinfrastructure. Services are provided for GNSS/GPS data, Imaging data, Strain and Seismic data, and Meteorological data. GNSS/GPS data enable millimeter-scale surface motions at discrete points. Data from geodetic imaging instruments can be used to map topography and delineate deformation with high spatial resolution. INSAR and Terrestrial LIDAR imaging data services are provided. Strain and seismic data from borehole strainmeters, seismometers, thermometers, pore pressure transducers, tiltmeters, and rock samples from drilling, as well as surface-based tiltmeters and laser strainmeters are available. In addition, temperature, relative humidity, and atmospheric pressure data are available from surface measurements of atmospheric conditions from stations. Tropospheric parameters are generated during daily GNSS/GPS post-processing managed by UNAVCO and are accessible through data access services. The program is optimized to enable access to high-precision geodetic data. The UNAVCO Data Archive includes more than 2,300 continuous GNSS/GPS stations.

Education and Community Engagement
The Education and Community Engagement program provides services to communicate the scientific results of the geodetic community, foster education across a broad range of learners, and grow workforce development and international partnerships. Particular focus is given to providing training, developing educational materials, and facilitating technical short courses to scientists studying geodesy. The program also supports formal education (K-12) and informal public outreach through workshops, educational materials for secondary students and undergraduate level courses, museum displays, and social media interactions. UNAVCO provides an annual series of short courses and workshops aimed at current researchers who want to update their skills or branch into new areas of geodetic research. UNAVCO Short Courses are offered to increase the capacity of the scientific community to process, analyze, and interpret various types of geodetic data. Educational Workshops promote a broader understanding of Earth science for college and secondary education faculty.

UNAVCO supports geo-workforce development through undergraduate internship programs, graduate student mentoring, and online resources. The premier internship program for upper division undergraduate students is Research Experience in the Solid Earth Science for Students (RESESS). RESESS is funded by the National Science Foundation (NSF) and ExxonMobil. It is a multi-year geoscience research internship as well as a community support and professional development program designed to increase the diversity of students entering the geosciences. Upper-division undergraduate students from underrepresented groups spend 11 weeks in Boulder, Colorado during the summer, conducting an independent geoscience-focused research project. RESESS is a summer internship program dedicated to increasing the diversity of students entering the geosciences. Interns work under the guidance of a research mentor and are mentored and supported throughout the academic year by RESESS program staff from UNAVCO. The alumni of RESESS are 55% Latino/Hispanic, 27% African American/Black, 11% Native American, and 7% Asian American. Of the 30 interns who have gone on to earn a bachelor's degree, 13 are enrolled in a master's degree program and 8 are currently enrolled in a doctoral program. Nine RESESS alumni are working in private industry, five of which are in the geosciences.

Membership and Governance
UNAVCO Members are educational or nonprofit institutions chartered in the United States (US) or its Territories with a commitment to scholarly research involving the application of high precision geodesy to Earth science or related fields. Members must also be willing to make a clear and continuing commitment to active participation in governance and science activities. Associate Membership is available to organizations other than U.S. educational institutions, when those organizations share UNAVCO's mission and otherwise meet the qualifications for membership.

A board of directors is charged with UNAVCO oversight and governance, and is elected by designated representatives of UNAVCO member institutions. The Board works with the science community to create a broad interdisciplinary research agenda based on applications of geodetic technology, to identify investigator needs for infrastructure support, to develop proposals to appropriate sponsors to maintain that infrastructure capability, and to ensure that UNAVCO and its activities provide high quality, cost-effective, and responsive support. Advisory committees for each of the three programs guide the focus of the programs and help shape their initiatives.

Science
For more than two decades, space-based geodetic observations have enabled measurement of the motions of the Earth's surface and crust at many different scales, with unprecedented spatial and temporal detail and increased precision, leading to fundamental discoveries in continental deformation, plate boundary processes, the earthquake cycle, the geometry and dynamics of mathmatic systems, continental groundwater storage, and hydrologic loading.

Space geodesy furthers research on earthquake and tsunami hazards, volcanic eruptions, hurricanes, coastal subsidence, wetlands health, soil moisture, groundwater distribution, and space weather.

Solid Earth
Earth and the tools to study it are constantly changing. The tectonic plates are continuously in motion, though so slowly that even with the highest precision instruments, months or years of observations are necessary to measure it. Over the last several decades, the advent of space-based geodetic techniques have improved the ability to measure tectonic plate motion by several orders of magnitude in spatial and temporal resolution as well as accuracy, and to establish stable terrestrial and celestial reference frames required to achieve these improvements. The research with these systems has led to revolutionary progress in our understanding of plate boundaries and plate interiors.

Cryosphere
Ice covers approximately 10% of Earth's land surface at the present, with most of the ice mass being contained in the Greenland and Antarctic continental ice sheets. Designing and undertaking geodetic experiments that enable researchers to improve the understanding of ice dynamics allows stronger predictions (through numerical models) of the response of the glaciers to changing climates.

Environmental and Hydrogeodesy
Through its sensitivity to mass redistribution and accurate distance measurements, geodesy is uniquely posed to answer fundamental questions about issues relating to water and the environment. Geodetic observations are enabling researchers, for the first time, to follow the motion of water within Earth's system at global scales and to characterize changes in terrestrial groundwater storage at a variety of scales, ranging from continental-scale changes in water storage using gravity space missions, to regional and local changes using INSAR, GNSS, leveling, and relative gravity measurements of surface deformation accompanying aquifer-system compaction.

Ocean
Seventy-five percent of Earth's crust is unobservable using solely electromagnetic energy-based geodetic techniques. Seafloor geodesy can now expand geodetic positioning to off-shore environments.  Researchers can see the effects of changes in Earth's crust far beyond what we can measure with instruments placed solely on dry land.

Atmosphere
Space geodesy utilizes electromagnetic signals propagating through the atmosphere of Earth, providing information on tropospheric temperature and water vapor and on ionospheric electron density. Thus, in the early twenty-first century, the goal of geodesy has evolved to include study of the kinematics and dynamics of both Earth's atmosphere and the solid Earth.

Human Dimensions
Geodetic research associated with earthquakes and volcanoes have goals of providing early warnings and mitigating future hazard events on a global scale. As the population density increases and more people live in proximity to seismically active faults, understanding the nature of earthquakes remains a goal of the Earth sciences.

Technology
High-resolution images and 3D/4D topography maps facilitate field-based tests of a new generation of quantitative models of mass transport mechanisms. Open access to data, tools and facilities for processing, analysis, and visualization, and new algorithms and workflows are changing the landscape of geodetic scientific collaboration.

See also
 Earth Scope Consortium
 Geodesy
 Plate Boundary Observatory
 Earth Scope
 IRIS Consortium

References

External links
 EarthScope Consortium
 
 Highlights
 Geodesy Science Snapshots
 Plate Boundary Observatory (PBO)
 Research Experience in Solid Earth Sciences for Students (RESESS)
 Africa Array at PSU

National Science Foundation
NASA
Independent research institutes
Geodesy organizations